The Law on Economic Growth, Social Progress and Fiscal Redressment, better known as the Unitary Law (Loi unique or Eenheidswet), was a Belgian law passed in 1961. The law introduced a fiscal austerity programme, intended to reduce Belgium’s large government debt and to respond to the independence of the Belgian Congo in 1960. It was championed by the Christian Social Party government of Gaston Eyskens.

The bill met with fierce protest from Liberals and Socialists alike. Opposition culminated in a general strike over the winter of 1960-61, described as "one of the most serious class confrontations in Belgium's social history", which brought out 700,000 workers out on strike. The protest was unsuccessful, however, and the law was passed on 14 February 1961. New elections were held soon afterwards, bringing to power a coalition of the Christian Social Party and Socialists.

References

Bibliography

External links
Full text of the law at the Belgian Official Journal

Belgian legislation
1961 in Belgium
Economic history of Belgium